Robert Steven (born 1 May 1957) is a former Australian rules footballer who played with Geelong in the Victorian Football League (VFL).

Notes

External links 		
		
		
		
		
		

Living people
1957 births
Australian rules footballers from Victoria (Australia)		
Geelong Football Club players
Barwon Football Club players